Morgansville is an unincorporated community in Doddridge County, West Virginia, United States. Its post office  is closed.

The community probably takes its name from nearby Morgans Run.

References 

Unincorporated communities in West Virginia
Unincorporated communities in Doddridge County, West Virginia